Dimitri Disseka Sea (born 20 August 2001) is a French professional footballer who last played as a forward for Barrow. He is a product of the Aston Villa Academy and Athletic Club Boulogne-Billancourt, having moved to England from his native Paris aged 15.

Career
Born in Paris, Sea joined Aston Villa's academy in 2017 after playing for Athletic Club Boulogne-Billancourt but was released in Summer 2020.

On 26 August 2020, he joined League Two side Barrow following a trial period with the club. He made his debut for Barrow on 3 November 2020 as a substitute in a 1–0 away defeat to Grimsby Town in League Two. He made 8 appearances across the 2020–21 season without scoring. He scored his first goal for the club in August 2021, an overhead kick against Scunthorpe United in the EFL Cup.

He was released from Barrow following the end of his contract in May 2022.

Career statistics

References

External links
 
 

2001 births
Living people
Footballers from Paris
French footballers
French sportspeople of Ivorian descent
Association football forwards
Aston Villa F.C. players
Barrow A.F.C. players
English Football League players
French expatriate footballers
Expatriate footballers in England
French expatriate sportspeople in England
Black French sportspeople